Munday is a city in Knox County, Texas, United States. The population was 1,246 at the 2020 census.

Geography

Munday is located at  (33.449292, –99.626028). It is situated at the junction of U.S. Highway 277, State Highway 222, and Farm Roads 1581 and 2811 in southeastern Knox County.

Munday is approximately 75 miles from both Abilene and Wichita Falls.

History

The community dates from 1893, when a store was built at the site. Originally known as Maud, it was renamed for postmaster R.P. Munday when the first post office was established in 1894. In 1903, West Munday merchants—separated by a thousand yards from East Munday—moved their buildings to the east. The Wichita Valley Railroad arrived in 1906, the same year that the community incorporated. With 968 residents in 1910, Munday was easily the largest town in Knox County. By 1950, the population reached 2,270. The population slowly decreased throughout the latter half of the twentieth century. Attractions in Munday include a nine-hole golf course, county library, city park, and antique shops.

Cotton has continued to major agricultural crop in the Munday area and continues to be a significant component of the local economy.  W. A. Earnest built a gin in 1900, and thereafter cotton processing remained significant, but Munday also became a center for vegetable processing, since irrigation encouraged local farmers to raise onions, potatoes, cucumbers, melons, and other produce.  Texas A&M University opened a vegetable research center in Munday in 1971.

Demographics

2020 census

As of the 2020 United States census, there were 1,246 people, 490 households, and 366 families residing in the city.

2010 census

As of the census of 2010, there were 1,300 people, a decrease of 14.87% since 2000 (227 people). The racial makeup of the town was 70.46% White (916 people), 7.00% African American (91 people), 0.46% Native American (6 people), 18.85% from other races (245 people), and 3.23% from two or more races (42 people). Hispanic or Latino of any race were 38.23% of the population (497 people).

2000 census

As of the census of 2000, there were 1,527 people, 597 households, and 404 families residing in the city. The population density was 1,078.5 people per square mile (415.2/km). There were 701 housing units at an average density of 495.1 per square mile (190.6/km). The racial makeup of the city was 69.48% White (1,061 people), 8.51% African American (130 people), 1.05% Native American (16 people), 0.20% Pacific Islander (3 people), 17.81% from other races (272 people), and 2.95% from two or more races (45 people). Hispanic or Latino of any race were 30.58% of the population (467 people).

There were 597 households, out of which 33.5% had children under the age of 18 living with them, 53.6% were married couples living together, 11.2% had a female householder with no husband present, and 32.2% were non-families. 31.0% of all households were made up of individuals, and 18.6% had someone living alone who was 65 years of age or older. The average household size was 2.47 and the average family size was 3.12.

In the city, the population was spread out, with 30.0% under the age of 18, 5.4% from 18 to 24, 23.7% from 25 to 44, 17.6% from 45 to 64, and 23.2% who were 65 years of age or older. The median age was 37 years. For every 100 females, there were 87.4 males. For every 100 females age 18 and over, there were 82.1 males.

The median income for a household in the city was $22,708, and the median income for a family was $28,158. Males had a median income of $22,303 versus $20,769 for females. The per capita income for the city was $11,593. About 21.8% of families and 29.1% of the population were below the poverty line, including 43.5% of those under age 18 and 17.0% of those age 65 or over.

Education
The City of Munday is served by the Munday Consolidated Independent School District.

Munday High School is rated an Recognized campus by the Texas Education Agency (2010).  The High School's mascot is the Moguls and school colors are purple and gold.  The Mogul football team won the Class A State Championship in 1984, 2007, and 2012.  The Mogulette track team won the State Championship 5 times; in '88,'89,'90,'91, and '99.  They were also State Champions in Cross Country twice; in '88 and '89.  The Mogul track team won State in '85,'88,'90,'91 and '11.  They still hold the State record in the 1600 meter relay and were named to the UIL All Century Track Team.  The Munday High School Purple Cloud Band has won the Texas 1A Honor Band Competition twice, in 1994 and 2000.  Munday's One Act Play has advanced to the State OAP Meet 10 times, winning the State Championship in '93, 2nd runner-up in '97, and 1st runner-up in 2008.  The school also has 3 State CX Debate championships. The 2019 competitors were Destyn Mauldin and Jonah Hernandez, Catalina Perry and Julie Valk also competed in the state meet and were only 2 points from finals while Jonah Hernandez and Destyn Mauldin were 4 away. Catalina Perry competed at the state Congress contest in 2020 and made it to the state finals and placed top 15.

Climate
The climate in this area is characterized by hot, humid summers and generally mild to cool winters.  According to the Köppen Climate Classification system, Munday has a humid subtropical climate, abbreviated "Cfa" on climate maps.

References

External links

The Munday Courier – Weekly Newspaper

Cities in Texas
Cities in Knox County, Texas